The Church with One Bell is a 1998 covers album by John Martyn. It was recorded in one week at CaVa Sound Studios, Glasgow, Scotland. The CD has a hidden bonus track after a 50 seconds break attached to the last track. It is a slower and remixed version without synthesizer of "How Fortunate The Man With None".

The cover depicts a former church in the village of Roberton in Lanarkshire, Scotland. Martyn, who at that time was living in an adjacent cottage, purchased the church and converted it into a recording studio.

Track listing
"He's Got All the Whiskey" (Bobby Charles)
"God's Song (That's Why I Love Mankind)" (Randy Newman)
"How Fortunate the Man with None " (Dead Can Dance; words: Bertolt Brecht)
"Small Town Talk" (Bobby Charles, Rick Danko)
"Excuse Me Mister" (Ben Harper)
"Strange Fruit" (Lewis Allan)
"The Sky Is Crying" (Elmore James, Clarence Lewis, Morgan Robinson)
"Glory Box" (Adrian Utley, Beth Gibbons, Geoff Barrow)
"Feel So Bad" (Lightnin' Hopkins)
"Death Don't Have No Mercy" (Reverend Gary Davis)

Personnel
John Martyn - vocals, guitar
John Giblin - bass
Spencer Cozens - piano, keyboards
Arran Ahmun - drums, percussion
Technical
Stefon Taylor - engineer
Lawrence Watson - photography

References

External links
John Martyn's Website

John Martyn albums
Independiente Records albums
1998 albums
Covers albums